"Kate" is a song written by Marty Robbins, and recorded by American country music artist Johnny Cash. It was released in March 1972 as the third single from his album A Thing Called Love. The song peaked at No. 2 on the Billboard Hot Country Singles chart. It also reached No. 1 on the RPM Country Tracks chart in Canada.  The song was originally recorded by Rex Allen on a 1961 single with the title "You Put Me Here (Sure as Your Name's Kate)" issued on San Antoniobased Hacienda Records Catalog No. WW-007.

Chart performance

References

1972 singles
1972 songs
Johnny Cash songs
Songs written by Marty Robbins
Song recordings produced by Larry Butler (producer)
Columbia Records singles